Contract bridge at the 2018 Asian Games was held at the Jakarta International Expo, Jakarta, Indonesia from 21 August to 1 September 2018.

China finished first in the medal table by winning 3 gold medals.

Schedule

Medalists

Medal table

Participating nations
A total of 213 athletes from 14 nations competed in bridge at the 2018 Asian Games:

References

External links
Contract bridge at the 2018 Asian Games
Official Result Book – Bridge

 
2018
2018 Asian Games events